Princess Arunvadi (13 June 1857 - 26 August 1933) was a Princess of Siam (later Thailand). She was a member of the Siamese royal family and a daughter of King Mongkut of Siam and Chao Chom Manda Run.

Her mother was Chao Chom Manda Run Supanimitr (a daughter of Kratai Supanimitr and Cham Supanimitr). She was given the full name Phra Chao Borom Wong Ther Phra Ong Chao  Arunvadi.

Princess Arunvadi died on August 26, 1933, at the age of 76.

References 

1857 births
1933 deaths
Thai female Phra Ong Chao
People from Bangkok
19th-century Chakri dynasty
20th-century Chakri dynasty
19th-century Thai women
20th-century Thai women
Children of Mongkut
Daughters of kings